Brackenridge is a Scottish surname with origins in southern Lanarkshire, Scotland. Notable people with the surname include:

 George Washington Brackenridge (1832–1920), Texas philanthropist
 Henry Marie Brackenridge (1786–1871), writer, congressman
 Hugh Henry Brackenridge (1748–1816), writer, judge
 John Brackenridge (clergyman) (1772–1844), American clergyman
 John Brackenridge (baseball) (1880–1953), American baseball player
 Marian Brackenridge (1903–1999), American sculptor
 Mary Eleanor Brackenridge (1837–1924), Texas business woman, suffragist and civic organizer
 Steve Brackenridge (born 1984), English footballer
 Tyron Brackenridge (born 1984), Canadian football player
 William Brackenridge (1810–1893), Scottish botanist

See also
Breckenridge (surname)

References

English-language surnames